Qarah Jangal (also Romanized as Qareh Jangal; also known as Qareh Jagal) is a village in Bizaki Rural District, Golbajar District, Chenaran County, Razavi Khorasan Province, Iran. At the 2006 census, its population was 480, in 118 families.

References 

Populated places in Chenaran County